The European White Elm cultivar Ulmus laevis 'Helena' is a Dutch introduction in commerce circa 2010 at the Boomkwekerij s'Herenland at Randwijk (PBR applied for: EU 20142249). The cultivar was cloned from a tree planted as one of a line of 17 White Elms at Eibergen circa 1900, which developed a straight central leader.

Description
The tree is described as having upright, uniform, growth, producing yellow leaves in autumn. At age 100, 'Helena' should be approximately 22 m high, with a crown diameter of about 12 m.

Cultivation
'Helena' is judged 'sustainable and durable in public parks', but has not been planted beyond the Netherlands (2016).

Accessions
None known

Nurseries

Europe
The Tree Centre, Opheusden, Netherlands
Van Den Berk (UK) Ltd., London, UK

References

European white elm cultivar
Ulmus articles with images
Ulmus